Cendrim Kameraj, also known as Qëndrim Kameraj (born 13 March 1999) is a professional footballer who plays for Kosovan club Dukagjini. Born in Switzerland, Kameraj represents Kosovo internationally.

Club career
He made his Serie C debut for Juventus U23 on 27 September 2018 in a game against Cuneo.

On 26 January 2019, Kameraj joined Swiss club Lugano until 30 June 2021.

On 27 January 2022, Kameraj signed with Kriens.

On 10 August 2022, Kameraj signed with Dukagjini in Kosovo.

International career
Kameraj was born in Switzerland and is of Kosovan descent. Kameraj represented Switzerland as a youth international, before switching to represent Kosovo in 2019.

References

External links
 

1999 births
Living people
Sportspeople from Lucerne
Swiss people of Kosovan descent
Association football fullbacks
Kosovan footballers
Kosovo under-21 international footballers
Swiss men's footballers
Switzerland youth international footballers
FC Luzern players
Juventus Next Gen players
FC Lugano players
SC Kriens players
Serie C players
Swiss 1. Liga (football) players
Swiss Challenge League players
Football Superleague of Kosovo players
Kosovan expatriate footballers
Swiss expatriate footballers
Expatriate footballers in Italy
Kosovan expatriate sportspeople in Italy